Sulfurimonas paralvinellae is a hydrogen- and sulfur-oxidizing bacterium.  It is a mesophilic chemolithoautotroph.

References

Further reading
Voordeckers, James Walter. Physiology and Molecular Ecology of Chemolithoautotrophic Nitrate Reducing Bacteria at Deep Sea Hydrothermal Vents. ProQuest, 2007.

External links

LPSN
Type strain of Sulfurimonas paralvinellae at BacDive -  the Bacterial Diversity Metadatabase

Campylobacterota